is a passenger railway station in located in the city of Daitō, Osaka Prefecture, Japan, operated by West Japan Railway Company (JR West). Although the station is named "Shijōnawate", it is not located in that city, but just across the border in Daitō.

Lines

Station layout
The station has two ground-level island platforms connected by an elevated station. The station has a Midori no Madoguchi staffed ticket office.

Platforms

Adjacent stations

History
The station was opened on 22 August 1895. 

Station numbering was introduced in March 2018 with Shijōnawate being assigned station number JR-H34.

Passenger statistics
In fiscal 2019, the station was used by an average of 18,488 passengers daily (boarding passengers only).

Surrounding area
 Osaka Prefectural Shijonawate High School
Shijonawate Gakuen Elementary School / Junior High School / High School
Shijonawate Gakuen Junior College

References

External links

Official home page 

Railway stations in Japan opened in 1895
Railway stations in Osaka Prefecture
Daitō, Osaka